Mohamed Ahmed Abu Ali (born 1964) is a Saudi Arabian fencer. He competed in the individual and team épée events at the 1984 Summer Olympics.

References

External links
 

1964 births
Living people
Saudi Arabian male épée fencers
Olympic fencers of Saudi Arabia
Fencers at the 1984 Summer Olympics